Aegires albus is a species of sea slug, a nudibranch, a marine, opisthobranch gastropod mollusk in the family Aegiridae. Its synonym Anaegires protectus Odhner, 1934 is the type species of the genus Anaegires Odhner, 1934 which was merged with Aegires by Wägele in 1987.

Distribution
This species was described from Antarctica. It has only been reported from the Antarctic Peninsula, Weddell Sea and Ross Sea.

Description
Aegires albus was redescribed by Wägele (1987) and by Troncoso et al. (1996).

References

Aegiridae
Gastropods described in 1912